Sandra Mikolaschek (born 18 June 1997) is a German para table tennis player. She is a World silver medalist and four-time European medalist in singles and team events playing alongside Lisa Hentig.

References

External links
 
 

1997 births
Living people
German female table tennis players
Paralympic table tennis players of Germany
Table tennis players at the 2016 Summer Paralympics
Table tennis players at the 2020 Summer Paralympics
People from Eisleben
People with paraplegia
Sportspeople from Düsseldorf
21st-century German women